Sampson Avard (October 23, 1800 – April 15, 1869) was one of the founders and leaders of the Mormon vigilantes known as the Danites, which existed in Missouri during the Missouri Mormon War in 1838.

Early life
Sampson Avard was born at St. Peter, Guernsey, Channel Islands, British Isles.  As an immigrant in the United States, he worked as a physician and later became a Campbellite minister in Pennsylvania.

Mormon convert 
In 1835 in Freedom, Pennsylvania, Orson Pratt baptized him a member of Church of the Latter Day Saints.

Church elder
Pratt ordained him an Elder and leader of the local branch of the church.  After serving a mission near his home with Erastus Snow, he moved to the Latter Day Saint community at Kirtland, Ohio in 1836.  He was ordained a High Priest in 1837, though his position as a High Priest was also revoked that same year for unclear reasons.

Danites
In 1838, while living in Far West, Missouri and serving in the church's High Council there, Avard witnessed the heated conflict between the growing Mormon population and the established non-Mormon Missourians.  He was the founding organizer and leader of the Danites, a secret paramilitary vigilante militia, bound by oaths and intent on retaliating for Mormon injuries and losses.  It remains unclear the extent to which Joseph Smith was aware or in favor of Avard's activities, although he recognized the Danites and encouraged them to be lawful.  Danite militaristic activities intensified the 1838 Mormon War and drew the attention of state government and militia.

Arrest and excommunication
After the Mormons were expelled from the Missouri and Joseph Smith was arrested, Avard was the chief witness against Smith, testifying that Smith was the mastermind behind the Danites.  Smith denounced the group as "frauds and secret abominations" and excommunicated Avard in March 1839.  Avard never attempted to return to the Latter Day Saints.

Post-Mormon years
In 1850 Sampson Avard was practicing medicine in Edwardsville, Illinois.

Death
Sampson Avard died in 1869 in Edwardsville, Madison County, Illinois.

Notes

References
 .

External links
 Biography at The Joseph Smith Papers Project

1800 births
1838 Mormon War
1869 deaths
American Latter Day Saints
American vigilantes
British Latter Day Saints
Converts to Mormonism from Restoration Movement denominations
Danites
Guernsey Latter Day Saints
Guernsey Mormon missionaries
Guernsey emigrants to the United States
Guernsey people
History of the Latter Day Saint movement
Mormon missionaries in the United States
People excommunicated by the Church of Christ (Latter Day Saints)
People from Edwardsville, Illinois
Religious leaders from Missouri